Duncan Alvin MacPherson (February 3, 1966 – August 9, 1989) was a Canadian professional ice hockey player who died under mysterious circumstances during a ski trip in Austria.

Early life and career
MacPherson was born in Saskatoon, Saskatchewan. A standout defensive defenceman for the Saskatoon Blades of the Western Hockey League, he was drafted in the first round, 20th overall, of the 1984 NHL Entry Draft by the New York Islanders. He played minor league hockey for the Springfield Indians of the American Hockey League and the Indianapolis Ice of the International Hockey League.

Disappearance
In the summer of 1989, MacPherson went to Europe. The New York Islanders had bought out and released the often injured MacPherson,  who never made it to the NHL. MacPherson had intentions of taking a job as a player-coach for a semi-pro hockey team in Dundee, Scotland, commencing in August 1989. Despite having a bad feeling about the entrepreneur Ron Dixon who was backing the Scottish team,  he travelled to central Europe alone in early August 1989.

He was scheduled to arrive in Dundee on August 12. When he did not show up, his family went to look for him. A car he had borrowed from a friend was discovered six weeks later in the parking lot of the Stubaital ski-region resort at the foot of the Stubai Glaciers in the Stubai Alps in Austria, where he had rented a snowboard. His last known contact was with an employee of the ski resort on August 9, who reported that he spoke with MacPherson, and last saw MacPherson departing alone to perhaps squeeze in some final snowboarding and hiking before nightfall.

Adding drama to the mystery was the fact that MacPherson claimed he had been contacted by the CIA, and that they were interested in recruiting him as a spy. The story was never confirmed.

In 2003, 14 years after MacPherson disappeared, an employee of the Stubai Glacier Resort discovered a glove sticking out of the ice of the melting Schaufelferner Glacier (one of the Stubai Glaciers' arms), in the middle of the ski run, where MacPherson's body had lain frozen.

Career statistics

See also
List of ice hockey players who died during their playing career

References

Further reading 
Website and Book by John Leake, published in 2012
An update to the 2006 CBC story above by the Canadian Broadcasting Corporation
Article from Esquire magazine, published in 2004
Story of his disappearance
Detailed chronology of events
In German language:
"Auf dünnem Eis" (On thin ice), story written by Florian Skrabal for Austrian magazine Datum – Seiten der Zeit, published 1 September 2009. Retrieved 7 October 2012
"Eisiges Schweigen" (Icy silentness), story by Malte Herwig for Bavarian newspaper Süddeutsche Zeitung, published 5 October 2012. Retrieved 7 October 2012

External links
 

1966 births
1989 deaths
Canadian people of Scottish descent
Ice hockey people from Saskatchewan
Indianapolis Ice players
National Hockey League first-round draft picks
New York Islanders draft picks
Saskatoon Blades players
Sportspeople from Saskatoon
Springfield Indians players
Canadian ice hockey defencemen